Australia competed at the 2018 Commonwealth Games in Gold Coast, Queensland between 4 and 15 April 2018. It was Australia's 21st appearance at the Commonwealth Games, having competed at every Games since their inception in 1930. Australia previously hosted the Games four times – 1938 Sydney, 1962 Perth, 1982 Brisbane and 2006 Melbourne.

Being the host nation, Australia sent a contingent of 474 athletes, participating in all of the 18 sports staged. Though only 469 competed. This was the highest number of athletes to represent Australia in a Commonwealth Games ever, eclipsing their previous record of 417 athletes at the 2014 Glasgow Commonwealth Games. Hockey athlete Mark Knowles was the country's flag bearer during the opening ceremony.

Administration
Steve Moneghetti was appointed Chef de Mission. He held this position at the 2010 and 2014 Games.
Opening ceremony appointments included: hockey player Mark Knowles as Australian flag bearer, lawn bowler Karen Murphy taking the athletes' oath and Australian netball coach Lisa Alexander the coaches' oath. Kurt Fearnley in his last major multi-sport competition was the closing ceremony flag bearer.

Competitors

| width=78% align=left valign=top |
The following is the list of number of competitors participating at the Games per sport/discipline.

Medallists

| width="78%" align="left" valign="top" |

* – Athlete competed in preliminary round(s) but not final round

| width="22%" align="left" valign="top" |

Athletics (track and field)

Athletics Australia announced an initial team of 51 athletes. On 1 March 2018, Athletics Australia announced the final team of 109 athletes, the second-largest team in history following Melbourne in 2006. On 6 March 2018, Ella Nelson withdrew from the team due to injury and was replaced by Larissa Pasternatsky. Marathon runner Chris Hammer withdrew on 1 April due to injury. On 5 April, Sally Pearson announced an Achilles tendon injury had forced her withdrawal from defending her 100 m hurdles gold medal and from the 4 × 100 m relay. Declan Carruthers was selected but did not compete in men's pole vault due to hamstring injury.

Men
Track & road events

Field events

Combined events – Decathlon

Women
Track & road events

Field events

Combined events – Heptathlon

Badminton

Team of ten athletes was announced on 23 February 2018.

Singles & doubles

Mixed team

Summary

Roster

Matthew Chau
Wendy Chen
Leanne Choo
Anthony Joe
Setyana Mapasa
Robin Middleton
Sawan Serasinghe
Ross Smith
Gronya Somerville
Renuga Veeran

Pool C

Quarterfinal

Basketball

Australia has qualified a men's and women's basketball teams (as the host nation) for a total of 24 athletes (12 men and 12 women).
Team of 12 men and 12 women was announced on 7 March 2018.

Summary

Men's tournament

Roster

Angus Brandt
Jason Cadee
Cameron Gliddon
Chris Goulding
Nick Kay
Daniel Kickert
Damian Martin
Brad Newley
Mitch Norton
Nathan Sobey
Lucas Walker
Jesse Wagstaff

On 2 April 2018, Mitch Creek and Matt Hodgson withdrew from the team and were replaced by Mitch Norton and Lucas Walker.

Pool A

Semi-final

Gold medal match

Women's tournament

Roster

Pool A

Semi-final

Gold medal match

Beach volleyball

Team of four athletes was announced on 24 February 2018.

Boxing

Team of thirteen boxers was selected on 14 December 2017. Twelve boxers were making their Commonwealth Games debut.
 Men

Women

Cycling

Team of 36 athletes was announced on 20 February 2018.

Road
Men

Women

Track

Sprint

Qualification legend: Q – Qualify to next round/gold medal round, QB – Qualify to bronze medal round.* – Due to only three nations participating in the event, no silver or bronze medals were awarded in accordance with Commonwealth Games regulations.

Keirin

Pursuit

Qualification Legend: Q – Athlete qualified to next round/gold medal round, QB – Athlete qualified to bronze medal round.* – Athlete cycled in preliminary round(s) but not in the final.

Time trial

Qualification legend: * – Due to only three nations participating in the event, no silver or bronze medals were awarded in accordance with Commonwealth Games regulations.
Points race

Scratch race

Mountain biking

Diving

Team of 14 divers was announced on 5 February 2018. Taneka Kovchenko was forced to withdraw from the Team just prior to the Games due to the risk of serious injury. She was replaced by Teju Williamson.
Men

Women

Gymnastics

Team of thirteen athletes announced on 28 February 2018. Team consists of five artistic men, five artistic women and three rhythmic women.

Artistic
Men
Team

Individual

Women
Team

Individual

Rhythmic
Team

Individual

Field hockey

Summary

Men's tournament

On 6 April, Blake Govers was ruled out with a broken finger and replaced with Tom Wickham.
Roster

Daniel Beale
Andrew Charter
Tom Craig
Matt Dawson
Jeremy Edwards
Jake Harvie
Jeremy Hayward
Aaron Kleinschmidt
Mark Knowles(c)
Tyler Lovell
Trent Mitton
Eddie Ockenden
Flynn Ogilvie
Lachlan Sharp
Jacob Whetton
Tom Wickham
Dylan Wotherspoon
Aran Zalewski

Pool A

Semi-final

Gold medal match

Women's tournament

Roster

Jocelyn Bartram
Edwina Bone
Jane Claxton
Ashlea Fey
Savannah Fitzpatrick
Jordyn Holzberger
Emily Hurtz
Jodie Kenny
Stephanie Kershaw
Rachael Lynch
Karri McMahon
Gabrielle Nance
Kaitlin Nobbs
Brooke Peris
Madi Ratcliffe
Emily Smith (c)
Grace Stewart
Renee Taylor

Pool B

Semi-final

Gold medal match

Lawn bowls

17 person team was announced on 5 December 2017.

Men

Women

Mixed para-sport

Officials: Team Leader – Peter Brown; Head Coach – Steve Glasson; Coaches – Kelvin Kerkow, Gary Willis; Team Manager – Faye Luke; Sport Psychologist – Mark McMahon – Sport Psychologist

Netball

Australia qualified a netball team by virtue of being the host country of the event.

Summary

Roster

Caitlin Bassett (captain)
April Brandley
Courtney Bruce
Laura Geitz
Susan Pettitt
Kim Ravaillion
Madi Robinson
Gabi Simpson (vice-captain)
Caitlin Thwaites
Liz Watson
Jo Weston
Stephanie Wood

Pool A

Semi-final match

Gold medal match

Rugby sevens

Summary

Men's tournament

Roster

Brandon Quinn replaced captain Lewis Holland who withdrew due to injury. James Stannard was forced to withdraw after being injured during a late night assault and was replaced by Nicholas Price.

Pool B

5th-8th Playoff

5th place match

Women's tournament

Roster

Pool B

Semi-final match

Gold medal match

Shooting

Team of 28 athletes was announced on 31 January 2018.

Men
Pistol/Small bore

Full bore

Shotgun

Women
Pistol/Small bore

Shotgun

Squash

Team of 12 athletes was announced on 15 December 2017.
Singles

Doubles

Swimming

After the 2018 Australian Championships and Commonwealth Games Trials, Swimming Australia announced a team of 70 athletes.

Men

Women

Table tennis

Team of 12 athletes was announced on 29 January 2018.

Singles

Doubles

Team

Triathlon

Team of six athletes announced on 17 November 2017. A further six paratriathletes announced on 25 February 2018.
Men

Women

Mixed

Weightlifting

Team of 16 athletes was announced on 23 January 2018. Five Paralympic powerlifters were added to the team on 7 March 2018. Simplice Ribouem withdrew prior to the competition due to injury.
Men

Women

Powerlifting

Australia participated with 4 athletes (3 men and 1 women). Cristine Ashscroft was selected but withdrew prior to competition due to illness.

Wrestling

Team of eight athletes was announced on 2 March 2018. Robert Whittaker withdrew from the Team on 16 March 2018.

Repechage Format

Nordic Format

References

2018
Commonwealth Games
Nations at the 2018 Commonwealth Games